William David Murray, 4th Earl of Mansfield, 3rd Earl of Mansfield, KT, DL (21 February 1806 – 1 August 1898) was a British Conservative politician.

The son of David William Murray, 3rd Earl of Mansfield, and Frederica Markham, daughter of William Markham, Archbishop of York, he succeeded his father in 1840 to the Earldom of Mansfield (1792 creation), and grandmother, Louisa Murray, 2nd Countess of Mansfield, in 1843 as Earl of Mansfield (1776 creation).

Murray was Tory Member of Parliament for Aldborough in 1830; for Woodstock in 1831; for Norwich from 1832 to 1837, and for Perthshire from 1837 to 1840. He served as a Lord of the Treasury in Sir Robert Peel's Administration from 1834 to 1835.

Murray was appointed Lord High Commissioner to the General Assembly of the Church of Scotland in 1852, 1858 and 1859. He was Lieutenant-Colonel of the Stirlingshire Militia from 1828 to 1855, Lord Lieutenant of Clackmannanshire from 1852, hereditary keeper of Scone Palace, and Senior Member of the Carlton Club.

He was appointed a Knight of the Thistle in 1843 and was for a time Senior Knight.

He died in 1898. In 1829 he had married Louisa, daughter of Cuthbert Ellison, Hebburn Hall, Durham, and they had one daughter and one son, William David Murray, Viscount Stormont, who predeceased him. He was succeeded by his grandson, William, 8th Lord Balvaird.

Arms

References

External links 
 

1806 births
1898 deaths
Deputy Lieutenants of Perthshire
4
Knights of the Thistle
William
British Militia officers
Lord-Lieutenants of Clackmannanshire
Murray, William David
Murray, William David
Murray, William David
Murray, William David
Murray, William David
Murray, William David
Murray, William David
Murray, William David
Mansfield, E4
Lords High Commissioner to the General Assembly of the Church of Scotland
Dunbar, William Murray, 4th Earl of